Rhizedra is a genus of moths of the family Noctuidae.

Species
 Rhizedra lutosa (Hübner, [1803])

References
Natural History Museum Lepidoptera genus database
Rhizedra at funet

Hadeninae